Engordany is an urban area in Andorra, located in the parish of Escaldes-Engordany. It is contiguous with Les Escaldes and Andorra la Vella.

External links

Populated places in Andorra
Escaldes-Engordany